Tomás Pérez Serra (born 13 November 1998) is an Argentine professional footballer who plays as a defender for Deportivo Español.

Career
Pérez Serra's senior career got underway with Deportivo Español. He scored on his professional debut on 18 April 2018, netting in a 1–0 win over UAI Urquiza in Primera B Metropolitana. One further appearance followed in 2017–18, prior to another twenty-four arriving in 2018–19 as Deportivo Español were relegated. In June 2022, Pérez Serra joined Primera Nacional side Santamarina.

Career statistics
.

References

External links

1998 births
Living people
Place of birth missing (living people)
Argentine footballers
Association football defenders
Primera B Metropolitana players
Primera Nacional players
Deportivo Español footballers
Club y Biblioteca Ramón Santamarina footballers